Narangba Valley State High School (NVSHS) is a co-educational, state secondary school in Narangba, Queensland. It is one of the newest schools in the state, having only opened on 1 January 2000.

Principals
 Ken Kennedy (2000–2002)
 Ross Mackay (2002–1 Aug 2014)
 Adam Colley (1 Aug 2014–2015) (5 Mar 2018- 16 July 2018)
 Steven Miskin (16 July 2018-15 December 2021)
 Kyrra Mickelborough (15 December 2021-present)

Uniform
The uniform for Narangba Valley State High School students varies depending on their year level and the day of the week. On Mondays, students are required to wear their formal uniform. For the juniors(7-9), this consists of a blue shirt and navy shorts or trousers for boys, and a blue blouse and navy skirt for girls, while the seniors(10-12) wear a white shirt instead. All senior students (years 10, 11 and 12) are required to wear a senior tie with their formal uniforms, while junior girls wear a crossover tie. Male senior students are only required to wear their tie in terms two and three.

During the other four days of the school week, students have a choice of wearing either the formal uniform or the unisex sports uniform. This consists of navy shorts as well as a green, navy blue and gold striped shirt for juniors and a predominantly navy blue shirt for seniors.

Academics
Narangba Valley State High School offers schooling from grade 7 (Grade 8 before 2015) through to 12. The school has had a reasonable amount of academic success, with 71% of students receiving an OP of 1 - 15 in 2006, one of the highest scores for state schools in the district.

Subjects are offered in a wide range of curriculum areas: Mathematics, English, SOSE, Science, Performing Arts, Life Technology (Home Economics), Design Technology (Manual Arts), ICT and Business, Physical Education, LOTE (Japanese and French) and Visual Arts.

As well as these Academic subjects, the school also has a weekly lesson designed to enhance the life skills of the students, known as SGD (Student Growth and Development). Another of these weekly lessons is VAP (Access to Vocational Pathways). In VAP, Year 10 students have been completing a Certificate I in Work Education, adding points towards their Queensland Certificate of Education. In Years 11 and 12, students complete preparation tests for the Queensland Core Skills Test

Academy programs
Since 2004 the school has offered extension programs in many subjects. Students are given the opportunity to nominate or be selected for the fast-tracked subjects in Year 8. These programs are offered in a number of different areas. They offer the SMA (Science and Maths Academy) for the more academically excelling students, a music academy, and an AFL and netball are being offered as well.

Core subjects
Students who achieve outstanding academic results are selected to take part in these programs.  The programs are offered until Year 11, when students are given the opportunity to undertake further courses during their senior years.

Academies are offered in Mathematics, English, Science and SOSE

Performing arts
At the beginning of Year 7, students are asked to audition for either of the three academies: Music, Dance and/or Drama. These students complete work faster than ordinary classes, and their assessment is expected to be of a higher standard. These academies continue until year 10, where students progress to complete their senior studies.

A recent addition to the academy program is Academy Camp and Tour. This involves Academy students preparing and rehearsing a performance, before traveling to a number of local schools and presenting the act.

The P.A.L.A.C.E.

Narangba Valley's Performing Arts and Lifestyle Academic Centre of Excellence is a state of the art hall, that was officially opened in 2005. The facility includes:
1500 seat indoor auditorium
Two full-size basketball courts
Six volleyball courts
Dodgeball courts
Two tennis courts
Four badminton courts
Two netball courts
Two purpose built drama classrooms
Sports gymnasium
Lighting and sound studio
All new stage lighting

Physical education

AFL Academy
The Narangba Valley AFL Academy has been successful in numerous endeavours. It was the first AFL academy in the state to have female participants. The grade 8 academy students won the statewide Fast Nines competition in 2005 and the Junior (grade 8 and 9) AFL team won the statewide Lion's Cup for 2006. This feat was also achieved by both the Junior and Senior girls teams in 2006. This great triumph was repeated in 2007 by the junior girls team. The boys' and girls' AFL teams have both completed a trip to Melbourne, in 2007 and 2008 respectively, to compete against local school teams. In 2010 the grade 8 girls won Fast Nines.

House system
Narangba Valley has five houses, one of which each student is a member of. Each house is named after an animal:

  KIRRAWA (yellow) - named after the goanna.
  BIDARA (orange) - named after the scorpion.
  MALOO (red) - named after the red-bellied black snake.
  GARAWI (blue) - named after the shark.
  ARINYA (green) - named after the kangaroo.

Over the course of each year, the different houses compete for a number of different championships and shields:

 Inter-House Swimming Carnival
 Inter-House Athletics Carnival
 Champion Sporting House
 Champion Service House
 Champion Cultural House
 Champion Academic House
Prior to 2018, four houses were used, named after Australian sportspeople. These were:
  FREEMAN (yellow) - named after runner Cathy Freeman
  LAVER (red) - named after tennis player Rod Laver
  O'NEILL (blue) - named after swimmer Susie O'Neill
  RAFTER (green) - named after tennis player Patrick Rafter

Extracurricular activities

The school's instrumental music program involves a large number of students. The school has a number of different ensembles, which perform at many events, as well as competitions including the Queensland Youth Music Awards.

Each year, numerous teams are entered into the QDU Debating Competition. Narangba Valley's teams have had reasonable success in recent years, with a number teams progressing into the finals competition.

In every other year, the school produces a musical, which contains a large number of students from the performing arts faculty. The following musicals have been produced:
 2004 - Grease
 2006 - Little Shop of Horrors
 2008 - The Wiz
 2010 - Beauty and the Beast
 2013 - Bugsy Malone
 2015 - High School Musical
 2017 - Camp Rock
 2019 - Wicked

See also
 Education in Australia
 List of schools in Queensland

References

External links
 Narangba Valley State High School Homepage
 Enrolment Management Plan, Education.qld.gov.au

Public high schools in Queensland
Schools in South East Queensland
Educational institutions established in 2000
2000 establishments in Australia